Abu'l-Qasim was the Seljuk governor of Nicaea, the Seljuk capital, from 1084 to his death in 1092.

Life
He was appointed to the post by Suleiman ibn Qutulmish, and after the latter's death in 1086, declared himself sultan. His authority however was limited to his own domain in Bithynia and Cappadocia, where his brother ruled; most of the Anatolian Seljuk realm fractured into independent or semi-independent emirates like the one led by Tzachas of Smyrna. Using his control of the Anatolian shore of the Marmara Sea, Abu'l-Qasim decided to build a navy at Kios and challenge the Byzantine navy. The Byzantine emperor Alexios I Komnenos sent two of his generals, Manuel Boutoumites and Tatikios, against him. Abu'l-Qasim's army was defeated, his fleet destroyed, and he himself was forced to retreat to Nicaea, from where he concluded a truce with the emperor (see Seljuk campaigns in the Aegean).

Sources 
 Speros Vryonis, The Decline of Medieval Hellenism in Asia Minor and the Process of Islamization from the Eleventh through the Fifteenth Century (University of California Press, 1971)

11th-century births
1092 deaths
Year of birth unknown
Sultans
Byzantine–Seljuk wars
People from Nicaea
Generals of the Seljuk Empire